Job 13 is the thirteenth chapter of the Book of Job in the Hebrew Bible or the Old Testament of the Christian Bible. The book is anonymous; most scholars believe it was written around 6th century BCE. This chapter records the speech of Job, which belongs to the Dialogue section of the book, comprising Job 3:1–31:40.

Text
The original text is written in Hebrew language. This chapter is divided into 28 verses.

Textual witnesses
Some early manuscripts containing the text of this chapter in Hebrew are of the Masoretic Text, which includes the Aleppo Codex (10th century), and Codex Leningradensis (1008). Fragments containing parts of this chapter in Hebrew were found among the Dead Sea Scrolls including 4Q100 (4QJob; 50–1 BCE) with extant verse 4 and 4Q101 (4QpaleoJob; 250–150 BCE) with extant verses 18–27.

There is also a translation into Koine Greek known as the Septuagint, made in the last few centuries BC; some extant ancient manuscripts of this version include Codex Vaticanus (B; B; 4th century), Codex Sinaiticus (S; BHK: S; 4th century), and Codex Alexandrinus (A; A; 5th century).

Analysis
The structure of the book is as follows:
The Prologue (chapters 1–2)
The Dialogue (chapters 3–31)
The Verdicts (32:1–42:6)
The Epilogue (42:7–17)

Within the structure, chapter 13 is grouped into the Dialogue section with the following outline:
Job's Self-Curse and Self-Lament (3:1–26)
Round One (4:1–14:22)
Eliphaz (4:1–5:27)
Job (6:1–7:21)
Bildad (8:1–22)
Job (9:1–10:22)
Zophar (11:1–20)
Job (12:1–14:22)
The Wicked Prosper but I Am Suffering (12:1–6)
God's Hand in Creation (12:7–12)
God's Active Control of the World (12:13–25)
Job's Stance (13:1–3)
Job's Rebuke of His Friends (13:4–12)
Addressing the Friends (13:13–19)
Addressing God (13:20–28)
The Brevity of Human Life (14:1–6)
The Lack of Hope for Humans (14:7–12)
Job's Imaginative Exploration of Hope (14:13–17)
The Lack of Hope – Again (14:18–22)
Round Two (15:1–21:34) 
Round Three (22:1–27:23)
Interlude – A Poem on Wisdom (28:1–28)
Job's Summing Up (29:1–31:40)

The Dialogue section is composed in the format of poetry with distinctive syntax and grammar. Chapters 12 to 14 contain Job's closing speech of the first round, where he directly addresses his friends (12:2–3; 13:2, 4–12).

Job addresses his friends (13:1–19)
Verse 1 opens with Job summing up his speech in chapter 12 before he addresses his friends in verses 2–12, contrasting Job's stance ("but I", verse 3) and his friends' ("but you", verse 4). Job calls for silence from his friends (verse 5, 13) as he wants to 'boldly pursue truth as he comes before God'. Although Job was afraid to approach God (verses 13b-14, also verse 21), he would press for litigation, knowing the risk and yet the hope for vindication (as in chapter 14).

Verse 15
[Job said:] "Though He slay me, yet will I trust in Him,
but I will defend my own ways before Him."
The RSV renders as: "Behold, he will slay me, I have no hope", whereas the NIV renders as "though he slay me, yet will I hope in him".

Job addresses God (13:20–28)
At verse 20, Job switches his address to God who can give and withhold a solution to his problems. Verses 20–27 can be classified as a lament, outlining what Job wants God to address the number of his sins to warrant the extent of punishments he has received. The closing remark is an imagery about a person without dignity, rotting away or destroyed by moths.

Verse 26
[Job said:] "For You write bitter things against me
and make me inherit the iniquities of my youth."
Job acknowledges that he committed sins in his youth (or 'youthful years'; cf. Psalm 25:7), but he had doubtless confessed them before and now wonders if his suffering is the long-delayed punishment for those past sins, which God has recorded and remembered. In Job 31:35, Job will use the same metaphor that he writes and signs his confession and places his case in God's hands.

See also

Related Bible parts: Job 9, Job 16, Job 42

References

Sources

External links
 Jewish translations:
 Iyov - Job - Chapter 13 (Judaica Press) translation [with Rashi's commentary] at Chabad.org
 Christian translations:
 Online Bible at GospelHall.org (ESV, KJV, Darby, American Standard Version, Bible in Basic English)
 Book of Job Chapter 13. Various versions
  Various versions

13